Hamma is a village and a former municipality in the Nordhausen  district, in Thuringia, Germany. Since 1 December 2010, it has been part of the town Heringen.

References

Former municipalities in Thuringia